Anastasiya Rarovskaya (born 19 June 1996) is a Belarusian racewalking athlete. She qualified to represent Belarus at the 2020 Summer Olympics in Tokyo 2021, competing in women's 20 kilometres walk.

References

 

1996 births
Living people
Belarusian female racewalkers
Athletes (track and field) at the 2020 Summer Olympics
Olympic athletes of Belarus